Delphi is the name of two different characters in Marvel Comics:

 Delphi (Morlocks), a Marvel Comics character appearing in the Uncanny X-Men series
 Delphi (Pantheon), a Marvel Comics character appearing in the Incredible Hulk series